George L. Buck (July 20, 1866 – December 6, 1939) was an American teacher, businessman, and politician.

Biography
Born in Shaftsbury, Vermont, Buck went to North Bennington High School and then graduated from Fort Edward Collegiate Institute. He then taught for several years in Vermont. In 1889, he moved to Racine County, Wisconsin and continued to teach. Buck was appointed railway mail clerk and then post office inspector. In 1902, Buck helped organized the Racine Iron & Wire Works and was also involved in the banking business. From 1919 to 1923, Buck served in the Wisconsin State Senate and was a Republican. Buck died of a heart attack at his home in Racine, Wisconsin.

Notes

1866 births
1939 deaths
People from Shaftsbury, Vermont
Politicians from Racine, Wisconsin
Businesspeople from Racine, Wisconsin
Educators from Vermont
Educators from Wisconsin
Republican Party Wisconsin state senators